Zinc finger protein 236 is a protein that in humans is encoded by the ZNF236 gene.

References

Further reading